The New Caledonia Super Ligue 2016 was the 43rd season of top-tier Caledonian football. It started on 3 March and ended on 3 December 2016. Thirteen teams took part in the championship. The two teams with the highest number of points were chosen to represent New Caledonia in the group stage of the 2018 OFC Champions League.

Standings

Relegation play-off
Out of the thirteen teams on the top tier of 2016, eleven are based on Grande Terre, the main island of New Caledonia, while two are from other islands (A.S. Horizon Patho from Maré Island and SC Ne Drehu from Lifou Island). At the end of the season, the worst placed team among the ones which are not based on the main island is either relegated directly (if finishing 8th or lower) or must face a play off against the winner of the Championnat des Îles 2016 (if finishing 7th or higher). Because Ne Drehu finished 4th and Horizon Patho finished 5th (even though they would have finished 4th, hadn't they been deducted 10 points), the latter played against E.S. Wacaelé.

First leg

Second leg

Horizon Patho won 2–1 on aggregate and both clubs therefore remain in their respective tiers for the 2017 season.

References

New Caledonia Super Ligue seasons
New
2016 in New Caledonian sport